Mohammad Anwar Khan is a Pakistani politician who has been a member of the National Assembly of Pakistan since August 2018.

Political career
He was elected to the National Assembly of Pakistan as a candidate of Muttahida Majlis-e-Amal (MMA) from Constituency NA-36 (Lakki Marwat) in 2018 Pakistani general election. He received 91,065 votes and defeated Ishfaq Ahmad Khan, a candidate of Pakistan Tehreek-e-Insaf (PTI).

More Reading
 List of members of the 15th National Assembly of Pakistan
 No-confidence motion against Imran Khan

References

Living people
Pakistani MNAs 2018–2023
Muttahida Majlis-e-Amal MNAs
Year of birth missing (living people)